Lower Caledonia  is a small community in the Canadian province of Nova Scotia, located in the Municipality of the District of Saint Mary's in Guysborough County. The population of Lower Caledonia is unknown because it has not been included in any of the StatCan census counts.

References

Communities in Guysborough County, Nova Scotia
General Service Areas in Nova Scotia